Antoniana may refer to the following:

 Juventud Antoniana, Argentine football club
 Rudolph-Antoniana, German knight academy
 Antoniana Margarita, a scientific text by 16th-century Spanish philosopher Gómez Pereira
 Banca Antoniana, one of the Italian banks that merged to form Banca Antonveneta

See also

 Antoniani
 Antoniano (disambiguation)